WRFD (880 kHz) is a commercial AM radio station licensed to both Columbus and Worthington, Ohio.  It is owned by the Salem Media Group and broadcasts a Christian talk and teaching radio format.  WRFD and sister station WTOH 98.9 FM share studios on North High Street in the northwest portion of Columbus.

WRFD is a daytimer station.  By day, it is powered at 23,000 watts non-directional. (Critical hours are at 6,100 watts.)  But 880 AM is a clear channel frequency reserved for Class A station WCBS in New York City.  So WRFD cannot broadcast on 880 after sundown.  Its transmitter is off Greenfield Avenue on the city's west side.  WRFD can be heard around the clock via FM translator station W283CL (104.5 FM), which launched in November 2016.

History
It broadcast only during the day, originally at 5,000 watts of power. It was owned and operated by Peoples Broadcasting Company. Peoples Broadcasting was a subsidiary of the Farm Bureau Mutual Insurance Company (the present-day Nationwide Mutual Insurance Company; the Ohio Farm Bureau Federation was Nationwide's founding member). WRFD was originally aimed at the regional agricultural market (hence the use of RFD, or rural free delivery), and had its studios and transmitter located on East Powell Road in rural Delaware County, north of Columbus.

WRFD held a construction permit for an FM station that actually was on the air for a period of time in the early 1950s.  But few people owned FM receivers in those days and the license was turned in a short time later.  In 1961, WRFD decided again to launch an FM station.  WRFD-FM 97.9 had a classical music format.  In 1967, it ended the classical format and it became WNCI.  WRFD was later sold to Buckeye Media in 1974, which sold it to current owner Salem Communications in late 1981.

Since February 1, 1982, WRFD has operated with a Christian talk radio format.  On air personalities at that time included Chuck Brown, Rick Dolezal, Boyce Lancaster, Bill DeWeese and Steve Lineberry. The station maintained a daily broadcast schedule of farm news and agribusiness information.  In the late '90s, the farm program adopted the brand Ohio Farm Radio.

One widely known WRFD farm broadcaster was Ed Johnson, who hosted the program from 1967 until 1972.  Leaving WRFD, he founded The Agri Broadcasting Network (ABN) which he owned and operated until his death in February 2001.  The longest serving Farm Director at the station during the Salem Years was Joe Cornely, who broadcast daily farm news and information until 1998, when he joined the Ohio Farm Bureau Federation staff.  He was followed by Darrin Johnston, who was replaced in 2002 by Andy Vance who left Salem Communications in 2005 to found the Buckeye Ag Radio Network, and later acquire Johnson's ABN Radio.

In 2005, Salem executives, with hopes of providing a more consistent programming schedule, decided to discontinue WRFD's agricultural programming.

Local programming
Local programming on WRFD includes Bob Burney Live on weekdays. On Saturdays, there is "Listen to Your Money," "Saving Face," and "Saturday Live," hosted by Columbus radio legend Tom Wiebell.

Translator

References

Notes 
  Nationwide Insurance and the Ohio Farm Bureau Federation have had a long and close relationship; Nationwide having originally been created by the farm bureau to meet the insurance needs of farmers.

External links 
FCC History Cards for WRFD 
 

RFD
RFD
Radio stations established in 1947
1947 establishments in Ohio
Salem Media Group properties
RFD